Handel premetro station is an Antwerp premetro station. Located under the intersection of the Handelsstraat with the Lange Stuivenbergstraat, it is served by lines 2, 3, 5 and 6.

Handel premetro station is the smallest premetro station in Antwerp. It is completely decorated with the colors of transport company De Lijn. The -1 level has a small ticket hall with access to the platforms; there is only one exit. The -2 level has a 60-meter platform for trains going toward Elisabeth station, the -3 level has the platform for trains going toward premetro Schijnpoort station.

In 1996 only line 3 served this premetro station. In 2006 line 5 was added, in 2007 line 6 was added and in 2012 line 2 was connected.

See also
 Trams in Antwerp

Antwerp Premetro
Railway stations opened in 1996
1996 establishments in Belgium